Ioannis Kouzeloglou (alternate spelling: Giannis) (born on April 1, 1995) is a Greek professional basketball player for Lavrio of the Greek Basket League. Standing at 2.07 m (6'9½") tall, he mainly plays at the power forward position.

Professional career
Kouzeloglou started his basketball career in the Greek basketball academy Mantoulidis Schools. On September 3, 2014, he signed a four–year deal with the Serbian Adriatic League team Partizan. The Greek player spent the 2014–15 season playing mostly for Partizan's junior team, but he also managed to make four appearances with the first team.

Kouzeloglou parted ways with Partizan on October 26, 2015, and on October 28, 2015, he agreed to terms with the Greek Basket League club Apollon Patras, where played the next two seasons. On July 4, 2017, he signed with Lavrio. During the 2019–20 season, Kouzeloglou was named team captain. 

On September 20, 2020, he signed with Aris Thessaloniki. After a very successful season (career-high averages of 10.5 points and 7.2 rebounds per contest in a total of 21 games), which also brought him into the ranks of the senior national team, Kouzeloglou amicably parted ways with the Greek team in order to join the French club Élan Béarnais Pau-Orthez. 

On July 24, 2021, he returned to Greece for Iraklis Thessaloniki. On December 31, 2021, he parted ways with the team over the legality of his contract submitted to the league authorities. On the same day, Kouzeloglou signed with AEK Athens for the rest of the season. In 26 league games (16 with AEK and 10 with Iraklis), he averaged 9 points, 6 rebounds and 0.9 assists, playing around 23 minutes per contest.

On November 24, 2022, Kouzeloglou made his official return to Lavrio.

Greek national team
Kouzeloglou also played with the junior national teams of Greece. With Greece's junior national teams, he played at the 2013 FIBA Europe Under-18 Championship and the 2014 FIBA Europe Under-20 Championship.

References

External links
 Ioannis Kouzeloglou at FIBA archive
 Ioannis Kouzeloglou at FIBA gamecenter
 Ioannis Kouzeloglou at eurocupbasketball.com
 Ioannis Kouzeloglou  at draftexpress.com
 Ioannis Kouzeloglou at eurobasket.com

1995 births
Living people
ABA League players
AEK B.C. players
Apollon Patras B.C. players
Basketball League of Serbia players
Élan Béarnais players
Greek expatriate basketball people in France
Greek expatriate basketball people in Serbia
Greek men's basketball players
Iraklis Thessaloniki B.C. players
KK Partizan players
Lavrio B.C. players
Power forwards (basketball)
Basketball players from Thessaloniki